Elections to Purbeck District Council were held on 4 May 2000. One third of the council was up for election and the Conservative Party stayed in overall control of the council.

After the election, the composition of the council was
Conservative 17
Independent 4
Liberal Democrat 3

Election result

References
2000 Purbeck election result

2000
2000 English local elections
20th century in Dorset